Hometowns is the debut album by Canadian indie rock band The Rural Alberta Advantage. Originally released independently in early 2008, the album gained international exposure when the band was selected as eMusic's featured artist of the month for November 2008. The band subsequently signed to Saddle Creek Records, and the label rereleased the album on July 7, 2009.

Track listing

References

2008 debut albums
Saddle Creek Records albums
The Rural Alberta Advantage albums